Lee Kong Chian  (18 October 1893 – 2 June 1967), also known by his alias Lee Geok Kun, was a prominent Chinese businessman and philanthropist based in Malaya and Singapore between the 1930s and the 1960s. He was the founder of the Lee Foundation and one of the richest men in Southeast Asia in the 1950s and 1960s. He was also a son-in-law of Tan Kah Kee, another well-known Chinese businessman and philanthropist based in Southeast Asia.

Early life and career
Lee was born in Furong Village in Nan'an, Fujian, towards the end of the Qing dynasty. His father was Lee Kuo Chuan. 

Lee received his early education in private schools in his hometown. In 1903, at the age of 10, he came to Singapore, then a British colony, to join his father. He studied at the defunct Anglo-Tamil School, and Chung Cheng High School.

Lee returned to the Qing dynasty in 1909 to complete his education under a scholarship, but had to end it in 1911 when the Xinhai Revolution broke out. In China, Lee studied at Chi Nan College in Nanjing and later the Railway and Mining College in Tangshan, which was one of the top colleges in China at that time, and a forerunner of the present-day Southwest Jiaotong University and North China University of Science and Technology.

Upon returning to Singapore, Lee worked as a teacher at Tao Nan School and as a translator at a Chinese-language newspaper company. He also worked as an assistant field surveyor with the Public Works Department. In 1915, Lee joined the China Guohua Company owned by Tan Kah Kee, and became Tan's protégé. He was promoted to the manager of the Tan Kah Kee Rubber Company in 1917. Three years later, he married Tan's daughter, Tan Ai Leh.

Business career
Seven years later, Lee set up his own rubber smoking house in Muar, Johor, Malaya, which became the Nam Aik Rubber Company in 1928. His enterprises of rubber planting and manufacture, pineapple planting and canning soon expanded to other parts of Southeast Asia, including Singapore, Malaya, North Borneo, Indonesia and Thailand. He was known as "Southeast Asia's Rubber and Pineapple King". He became one of the richest men in the region, with the Lee Rubber Company becoming a multimillion-dollar business which he started in 1931. His brother George Lee joined him at the company. At the height of their fortune, the company's worth was estimated to be S$600 million.

Lee also went into banking. He became the general manager and vice-chairman of Huayi Bank. In 1933, he was appointed as the vice-chairman of Oversea-Chinese Banking Corporation, a corporation formed from the merger of three Chinese banks.

Lee's support for education 
In 1934, Lee became the chairman of the Board of Directors of The Chinese High School (now Hwa Chong Institution), a post he held until 1957. In 1939, Lee founded Guozhuan Primary School in his hometown, Furong Village. In 1941, Lee donated his properties in River Valley, Singapore for the establishment of Nan Chiau Teachers' Training College (now Nan Chiau High School). He gave lectures in Columbia University during the Second World War while he was stranded in the United States. Lee became the vice-chancellor of the University of Singapore (now the National University of Singapore) and donated S$1 million for the development of a medical college on the college's grounds. 

Other institutions received financial support from the Lee Foundation, including the National University of Singapore, Anglo-Chinese School, St. Margaret's Secondary School, Methodist Girls' School, Singapore Chinese Girls' School, Tao Nan School, Anglican High School and The Chinese High School. The Lee Kong Chian School of Business at the Singapore Management University was named in his honour.

Like Tan Kah Kee, Lee poured his wealth into education and other philanthropic work. He set up the Lee Foundation in Singapore and Malaya in 1952 and 1960 respectively. In 1965, the Lee Foundation Limited was established in Hong Kong. 

Lee also spearheaded free public library services for Singapore when he donated S$375,000 through the Lee Foundation to allow the Singapore Government to build the Old National Library building at Stamford Road. The Foundation had donated sums amounting to S$300 million to various causes with no conditions attached between 1952 and 1993.

Later life

Lee's work and generous contributions to education and society were recognised. He was conferred an honorary Doctor of Laws by the University of Malaya in 1958. In 1964, Malaysia's Yang di-Pertuan Agong (head of state), Putra of Perlis, awarded Lee the title Panglima Mangku Negara (PMN), hence Lee was known by the honorific Tan Sri. Prior to that, Lee had been made Dato' by the Sultans of Johor and Kelantan in 1957 and 1959 respectively. He became the chairman of OCBC Bank in 1938 and remained in that position until his death. In 1965, Lee was conferred another honorary degree, Doctor of Letters, by the University of Singapore in recognition of his services to the university and his contributions to arts and education.

Legacy
Lee died in 1967 and is survived by three sons and three daughters.

Places named after Lee Kong Chian
 Lee Kong Chian Reference Library, National Library, Singapore
 Lee Kong Chian Wing, University Hall, National University of Singapore
 Lee Kong Chian Natural History Museum, National University of Singapore
 Lee Kong Chian Centre for Mathematical Research, National University of Singapore
 Lee Kong Chian School of Medicine, Nanyang Technological University
 Lee Kong Chian Lecture Theatre, Nanyang Technological University
 Lee Kong Chian School of Business, Singapore Management University
 Lee Kong Chian Faculty of Engineering and Science (LKCFES), Universiti Tunku Abdul Rahman (UTAR)
 Tan Sri Lee Kong Chian Hall, Methodist College Kuala Lumpur
 Lee Kong Chian Gardens School, LGS-MINDS
 Lee Kong Chian Library, Anglican High School
 Lee Kong Chian Auditorium, Anglo-Chinese School (Barker Road)
 Kong Chian Administration Centre, Hwa Chong Institution
 Kong Chen Hall, Chong Hwa Independent High School, Kuala Lumpur
 Kong Chian Hall, SJK (C) Cheng Siu 1
 Kong Chian Hall, Kuala Lumpur Selangor Chinese Assembly Hall 
 Kong Chien Hall, Foon Yew High School, Johor Bahru
 Kong Chian Hall, Singapore [Chung Cheng High School (Main), Singapore]
 Kong Chian Hall, Nan Chiau High School
 Kong Chian Library, Hwa Chong Institution (High School Section)

Places named after Lee Kong Chian's father
There are also some places named after Lee's father, Lee Kuo Chuan, including:
 Kuo Chuan Avenue, a road in Singapore's Marine Parade district
 Kuo Chuan Presbyterian Secondary School
 Kuo Chuan Presbyterian Primary School
 Heritage Centre, Hwa Chong Institution (High School Section), previously known as Kuo Chuan Art Centre
 Lee Kuo Chuan Stadium, Anglican High School
SRJK (C) Kuo Kuang (国光国民型华文小学) No. 1 and SRJK (C) Kuo Kuang No. 2 - Two Chinese medium primary school in Skudai, Johor Bahru, Malaysia, named after the combination of middle names of Lee 'Kuo' Chuan and Lee 'Kong' (Kuang) Chian.

Honours

Honours of Malaysia
  :
  Commander of the Order of the Defender of the Realm (PMN) – Tan Sri (1964)
  :
  Knight Grand Commander of the Order of the Life of the Crown of Kelantan (SJMK) – Dato' (1959)
  :
  Knight Grand Commander of the Order of the Crown of Johor (SPMJ) – Dato’ (1960)

References

1893 births
1967 deaths
Commanders of the Order of the Defender of the Realm
20th-century Singaporean businesspeople
Singaporean people of Hokkien descent
Singaporean philanthropists
Jinan University alumni
20th-century philanthropists
Knights Grand Commander of the Order of the Crown of Johor
Chinese emigrants to British Malaya